Gardena Pass (or Jëuf de Frea) is a high mountain pass in the Dolomites of the South Tyrol in northeast Italy.

The road over it comprises part of the famous Sella Ring, in which four linked passes (Gardena, Sella, Pordoi, and Campolongo) encircle the spectacular Sella group. The route becomes busy with tourists, motorcyclists, and cyclists during the summer. There are tourist accommodations on the pass itself, and hikers visit the pass to access the dramatic Dolomite mountains.

Pizes de Cir 
North of the pass in the direct vicinity, the mountain range Pizes de Cir with 2592 meter high peak the Gran Cir can be seen.

Maratona dles Dolomites
The Gardena Pass is the fourth of seven Dolomite mountain passes which riders cross in the annual Maratona dles Dolomites single-day bicycle race.

World Cup ski racing
Men's World Cup alpine ski races are held annually in mid-December on both sides of the pass, with a downhill at Val Gardena and the classic Gran Risa giant slalom at Alta Badia.

See also
 List of highest paved roads in Europe
 List of mountain passes

External links
CYCLEFILM's Video Reconnaissance of the Gardena Pass (Part of Maratona dles Dolomites Guide DVD)

Mountain passes of South Tyrol
Mountain passes of the Dolomites